PIRSA may refer to:
 Perimeter Institute Recorded Seminar Archive (PIRSA)
 Primary Industries and Regions SA, a South Australian government agency